Heorhiy Ilarionovych Maiboroda, sometimes transliterated as Georgiy or Heorhy Maiboroda or Mayboroda (– 6 December 1992), was a Ukrainian composer.

Maiboroda, whose brother Platon Maiboroda was also a composer (mainly of songs), studied at the Glière College of Music in Kiev, where he studied under Levko Revutsky, graduating in 1941 and teaching there from 1952 to 1958. From 1967 to 1968 he was head of the Composers Union of Ukraine.

His musical career was based in Ukraine, and he set several operas to Ukrainian librettos, including Yaroslav the Wise (1973, published 1975), Arsenal (published 1961), Mylana (published 1960), and Taras Shevchenko (1964, published 1968; based on the life of the Ukrainian artist and poet of that name), all of which were produced at the Kiev Opera House. He also prepared a performing edition of Semen Hulak-Artemovsky's opera, Zaporozhets za Dunayem.

Amongst other works, Maiboroda wrote a suite of incidental music to Shakespeare's King Lear, three symphonies, two piano concertos and a violin concerto, as well as numerous songs and romances.

In 1963 he was awarded a Shevchenko National Prize for his work by the Ukrainian SSR.

Notes

1913 births
1992 deaths
Ukrainian people in the Russian Empire
Ukrainian classical composers
Ukrainian opera composers
People from Poltava Oblast
People from Kremenchugsky Uyezd
Recipients of the Shevchenko National Prize
20th-century classical composers
Male classical composers
20th-century male musicians
Soviet composers